Devadasi is a 1948 Indian Tamil-language film directed by Manik Lal Tandon and T. V. Sundaram. The film stars Kannan, Leela, R. Balasubramaniam and K. S. Angamuthu.

Cast
The list was adapted from the review article in The Hindu newspaper.

Kannan as the King's friend
Leela as Devakunjari
R. Balasubramaniam as the spiritual guru
K. S. Angamuthu as the smart devadasi woman
T. S. Durairaj as The king
N. S. Krishnan as a Carnatic musician
T. A. Mathuram as a Bharathanatyam dancer

Production
The film was produced by Sukumar Pictures and was directed by Manik Lal Tandon (M. L. Tandon) and T. V. Sundaram. B. S. Ramiah wrote the screenplay and dialogues to the story that was based on a French opera, Thaïs. P. S. Rai was in charge of cinematography while R. Rajagopal did the editing. Art direction was done by Gangatharan and Shanmuganathan. This film was shot at Neptune Studios.

Soundtrack
Music was composed by K. V. Mahadevan while the lyrics were penned by Rajagopala Iyer and Udumalai Narayana Kavi. N. S. Krishnan was the singer and Playback singer is Sundari Thambi.

"Bhagyasaali Naane" - Sundari Thambi
"Pudhu Malare" - Sundari Thambi
"Idhupol Aanandhame" - K. V. Mahadevan, Sundari Thambi
"Oru Vaarthaiye Solluvaai" - Sundari Thambi

Reception
Writing in June 2013, film critic Randor Guy said "In spite of the high expectation, the film did not fare well at the box-office and only the comedy track became popular."

See also
 Devadasi

References

External links

Indian drama films
Films scored by K. V. Mahadevan
1948 drama films
1948 films
Indian black-and-white films
1940s Tamil-language films